This is a list of United States Marine Corps brigades.

Marine Expeditionary Brigades

 1st Marine Expeditionary Brigade
 2nd Marine Expeditionary Brigade
 3rd Marine Expeditionary Brigade
 4th Marine Expeditionary Brigade (Anti-Terrorism)
 5th Marine Expeditionary Brigade
 6th Marine Expeditionary Brigade
 7th Marine Expeditionary Brigade
 9th Marine Expeditionary Brigade

Marine Provisional Brigade

 US 1st Marine Brigade (Provisional)
 US 2nd Marine Brigade (Provisional)
 US 3rd Marine Brigade (Provisional)

Brigades of the United States Marine Corps
Brigades